Sweetwater Township is one of the six townships of Clay County, North Carolina, United States, located in the northwestern part of the county. The other five are Brasstown, Hayesville, Shooting Creek, Hiawassee, and Tusquittee.

References

Townships in Clay County, North Carolina
Townships in North Carolina